C-jun-amino-terminal kinase-interacting protein 3 is an enzyme that in humans is encoded by the MAPK8IP3 gene.

The protein encoded by this gene shares similarity with the product of Drosophila syd gene, required for the functional interaction of kinesin I with axonal cargo. Studies of the similar gene in mouse suggested that this protein may interact with and regulate the activity of numerous protein kinases of the JNK signaling pathway, and thus function as a scaffold protein in neuronal cells. The C. elegans counterpart of this gene is found to regulate synaptic vesicle transport, possibly by integrating JNK signaling and kinesin-1 transport. Several alternatively spliced transcript variants of this gene have been described, but the full-length nature of some of these variants has not been determined.

Interactions
MAPK8IP3 has been shown to interact with ASK1, C-Raf, PTK2, MAPK10, Mitogen-activated protein kinase 9, MAPK8, MAP2K1, KLC2, MAP2K7, KLC1, MAPK8IP2 and MAP2K4.

References

Further reading